Arvind Dave (born 1 May 1940) is the former Governor of four states in India. He was the Governor of Arunachal Pradesh during 1999–2003;, Governor of Manipur, during 2003–2004 and acting governor of Meghalaya and Assam briefly during 2002 and 2003 respectively. He hails from Udaipur in Rajasthan.

He was the Director of the Research and Analysis Wing (RAW) - India's external intelligence agency - from 1997 to 1999. He was chief of the agency during the Kargil War and Operation Shakti, India's nuclear program. As the Director of RAW, he also chaired the Joint Intelligence Committee during that period.

References

1940 births
Living people
Rajasthani people
Dave, Arind
Governors of Manipur
Governors of Assam
Governors of Meghalaya
People from Udaipur
People of the Research and Analysis Wing